Borovets, known as Chamkoria until the middle of the 20th century, is a popular Bulgarian mountain resort situated in Sofia Province, on the northern slopes of Rila, at an elevation of 1350 m. Borovets is located approximately 10 km from Samokov, 70 km from Sofia, and 110 km from Plovdiv.

History 
Borovets is the oldest Bulgarian winter resort with a history that dates back to 1896. Borovets was originally established at the end of the nineteenth century as a hunting place for the Bulgarian Kings. Borovets gradually developed into a modern ski resort with hotels, restaurants, bars and a network of ski runs and lifts along the slopes of the Rila Mountains, providing a whole range of winter sports. The resort has hosted World Cup twice, Alpine Skiing rounds (1981 and 1984), while the Biathlon track is one of the best in the world.

Super Borovets 
The Super Borovets project is one of the largest and most expensive investment and development projects in Bulgarian history. The plan is to enlarge Borovets town to encompass the nearby towns of Samokov and Beli Iskar. The resort will be divided into three levels:

Level 1 or Low Borovets:  A brand new development just outside Samokov, this area will cater for the less economically well off tourists, but will have good connections and transport with Borovets and the main ski area. This project will provide around 5,000 hotel rooms.

Level 2 or Borovets: Consists of the existing Borovets with extensive investment and development. This will provide around 10,000 hotel rooms (approximately what Borovets currently provides) and will remain as the main accommodation area.

Level 3 or Super Borovets: This will cater for those looking for 5 star hotels and a luxury experience, however it will provide no more than 2,500 hotel rooms.

The current plan from the architects (subject to review and acceptance by the ecology team) is to expand the number of pistes by constructing 19 new pistes bringing the total ski-able area to around 90 km. To cope with the higher demand for ski-lifts and gondolas, 12 new ski-lifts will be built. One of these lifts will be a multi-station gondola which connects Borovets to Samokov allowing skiers easy access to the slopes from the Lower Borovets development site.

The project was launched in 2004 and was to be completed by 2009, however several setbacks have delayed it. The project was then given the go-ahead in October 2007, amidst opposition from environmentalists. However, by February 2010, still nothing had happened with the whole project mired in financial problems as a result of the late-2000s financial crisis, and the project's backers denying that work had restarted.

Climate 
Borovets has a humid continental climate (Dfb) with long, cold, and snowy winters and short, warm, and rainy summers with cool nights.

Winter sports 
The ski resort is at an altitude of 1350 m. 58 km of marked pistes cover the generally north facing slopes up to an altitude of 2560 m, with many runs terminating near the village centre allowing skiers to ski almost to their hotel door. The longest run is a gentle 12 km return to the resort along the maintenance road.

Downhill skiing 

Borovets Ski Slopes

Lifts 

All ski lifts are open 8.30 am to 6.30 pm. Each lift closes for technical checks and maintenance for half a day each week and for 1 full day each month, see local signs for dates and times for each lift.

Borovets Lifts

The lift infrastructure of the resort is very well developed by drag lifts, baby tows, seat chain lifts, plus a gondola lift. 1 six-seat Gondola lift, 2 High Speed Quad Chair lifts, 1 Fixed Grip Quad Chair lift, 10 Surface ski lifts and 9 tow lifts. As for the 6-person gondola lift, it takes you to the Yastrebets peak on 2363 m above sea level. The difference in altitude is approx. 1046 m and length of route is 4827 m. The gondola lift has a capacity of 1200 persons per hour. The journey takes around 20 minutes. The total capacity of all tow lifts of Borovets is 8150 persons per hour.

A 200-meter carpet lift takes the skiers from ski centre Markudjik to the upper station of the gondola lift "Yastrebetz"; and the widened 10 km long Musala Pathway provides an easy way to return to the resort.

Night skiing

For night skiing there is a different lift pass that has to be bought separately at the kiosks on the pistes. It is valid from 6 pm till 9.30 pm.

Cross-country skiing 
The resort also offers biathlon facilities for training and competitions.  33 km of cross country trails are designed according to the requirements of FIS (Federation Internationale de Ski), although they cancelled the last two cross-country events to be held in Borovets, in 2009 and 2010.

Landmarks

The Black Rock of Chamkoria 
It is located near the resort of Borovets and is a huge stone rock whose walls rise above the valley of the Golyama Slivnitsa River. The distance from the top to its foot is 135 m. At its upper part is a flat rocky ground, secured by a metal railing, from which there is a scenic view of the mountain slopes and the forested abyss. The view is interspersed by the fog between the trees and the rock formations. The place is easily accessible and does not require any special preparation. The terrain is mostly flat and the transition from Borovets to the Black Rock takes just over an hour of peaceful walking. The starting point of the eco route is one of the main streets of the resort, which leads to an equestrian base on the outskirts of Borovets. From here it takes a dirt road, just straight and, leads to the forest. Turn left onto a path that leads to a T-shaped branch. Take the right, after 30 meters - again left on a path. After 5 minutes you will reach the dirt road to the huts "Maritza" and "Zavrachitsa". It turns right and shortly there is a deviation for the natural phenomenon Black Rock. After 15 minutes the walk reaches the cliff.

The black rock also has a sad image. In this abyss after September 9, 1944, 60-70 people were killed without trial and sentence (their exact number is still unknown) by Samokov, the villages of Beli Iskar and Belchin. For the victims of the communist regime, writer Georgi Markov is writing a book entitled The Black Rock. An iron cross was erected on the frontal site in memory of those who died.

The Kings Palace (Tsarska Bistritsa) is open from 10 till 5 Friday to Sunday.

References

External links 
 
 

Cross country running venues
Ski jumping in Bulgaria
1896 establishments